Frederik Engel, known as Freek Engel (30 November 1872 – 8 November 1958), was a Dutch painter. His work was part of the art competitions at the 1924 Summer Olympics and the 1936 Summer Olympics.

References

1872 births
1958 deaths
19th-century Dutch painters
20th-century Dutch painters
Dutch male painters
Olympic competitors in art competitions
People from Zaanstad
19th-century Dutch male artists
20th-century Dutch male artists